The Royal Commission on Trade Unions and Employers’ Associations (also known as the Donovan Commission) was an inquiry into the system of collective UK labour law, chaired by Lord Donovan and heavily influenced by the opinions of Hugh Clegg. Its report, known as the "Donovan Report", was issued in 1968 (Cmnd 3623).

Overview
The Commission originally was inclined to recommend legal constraints on unions, (as presaged by Barbara Castle's White paper, In Place of Strife), in order to back up governmental prices and incomes policy. However Clegg, by threatening to issue a minority report, persuaded it instead to back improved collective bargaining.

The recommendations of the Commission on dismissal procedures were embodied in the Industrial Relations Act 1971. Exclusive jurisdiction to hear complaints and give remedies was conferred upon the newly created National Industrial Relations Court. The Trade Union and Labour Relations Act 1974 soon replaced the unfair dismissal provisions, as was the National Industrial Relations Court with a system of Industrial Tribunals, since renamed Employment Tribunals. These have one legally qualified chairperson and two lay members, one representing unions and the other representing employers.

The present law on unfair dismissal is found in the Employment Rights Act 1996.

Report chapters

Introduction
The Subject Matter of Our Report
The System of Industrial Relations
The Reform of Collective Bargaining
The Extension of Collective Bargaining
The Efficient Use of Manpower
Strikes and Other Industrial Action
The Enforcement of Collective Agreements
Safeguards of Employees Against Unfair Dismissal
Labour Tribunals
Safeguards for Individuals in Relation to Trade Unions
Trade Unions
Employers' Associations
Changes in the Law
Workers' Participation in Management
Summary of the Main Conclusions and Recommendations

See also
UK labour law
Lord Donovan
Hugh Clegg (industrial relations expert)

References

Further reading
 
 
 
 
 

United Kingdom labour law
1965 establishments in the United Kingdom
1968 disestablishments in the United Kingdom
British Royal Commissions
British trade unions history